Chelis erschoffii is a moth in the family Erebidae. It was described by Sergei Alphéraky in 1882. It is found in Central Asia (Chatkal, Sussamyr, Kirghizskii Alatau, Kungei Alatau, Terskei Alatau, Nary, Sarydzhaz, Trans-Ili, Xinjiang, Julduz).

This species was moved from the genus Palearctia to Chelis as a result of phylogenetic research published in 2016.

Subspecies
 Chelis erschoffii erschoffii (Tien Shan)
 Chelis erschoffii miranda Plustsch & Dolin, 2000 (Kyrgyzstan)
 Chelis erschoffii sarydzhasica Plustsch & Dolin, 2000 (Kyrgyzstan)
 Chelis erschoffii selmonsi (Böttcher, 1905) (Inner Tien Shan)

References

Moths described in 1882
Arctiina